The 1868 Alabama gubernatorial election took place on February 4, 1868, in order to elect the governor of Alabama. Republican William Hugh Smith ran unopposed. This is the first time that a Republican became governor of Alabama.

Results

References

1868
gubernatorial
Alabama
February 1868 events